This is a list of notable caves and cave systems in Vietnam.

Caves in Vietnam

References

See also
 Phong Nha-Kẻ Bàng National Park

Vietnam
Caves